Deep Blue is an album by American singer/songwriter Peter Mulvey, released in 1997.

Reception

Writing for Allmusic, critic Darryl Cator wrote of the album, "Mulvey's songwriting is still in the developing stages. While his lyrics attempt cleverness and depth, they often achieve only earnestness. The melodies become somewhat monotonous by the album's end... But there are moments where these songs achieve inspiring bursts of transcendence, painting vast aural landscapes which perfectly decorate Mulvey's emotional imagery."

Track listing
All songs by Peter Mulvey unless otherwise noted.
"Grace" – 4:08
"Smoke" – 4:29
"Midwife" – 4:45
"Take This" – 3:37
"No Sense of Humor" – 3:38
"Deep Blue" – 4:47
"Every Mother's Son" (Chris Smither) – 4:37
"Birgit" – 3:22
"Out Here" – 4:06
"Clap Hands" (Tom Waits) – 4:08
"Forever Night Shade Mary" – 2:30

Personnel
Peter Mulvey – vocals, guitar
David "Goody" Goodrich – guitar, mandolin, keyboards, National Steel Guitar
Kris Delmhorst – cello
Mike Piehl – drums
Tony Levin – bass
Jackson Cannon – upright bass

Production notes
Nick Sansano – producer, engineer, mixing
Sarah Beth Wiley – design, photography
Tom Coyne – mastering

References

Peter Mulvey albums
1997 albums